Events from the year 1884 in art.

Events
 February 2 – First annual exhibition of Les XX opens at the Palais des Beaux-Arts in Brussels. Artists invited to show in addition to members of the group include Auguste Rodin, James McNeill Whistler and Max Liebermann.
 March – Theo van Gogh starts buying and selling Impressionist works, beginning with a painting by Pissarro.
 April – Camille Pissarro moves to Éragny-sur-Epte.
 May 15–July 15 – Groupe des Artistes Indépendants stages the first officially sanctioned open exhibition of contemporary art in Paris.
 July 29 – Société des Artistes Indépendants established in Paris under the leadership of Albert Dubois-Pillet.
 August 30 – Austrian painter Marianne Preindlsberger marries English painter Adrian Scott Stokes.

Works

 Michael Ancher – Portrait of my wife, the painter Anna Ancher
 Henry Baerer – Ludwig van Beethoven (bronze sculpture, version for Central Park, New York City)
 Marie Bashkirtseff – The Meeting
 Anna Bilińska-Bohdanowicz – A Negress
 Jules Breton – The Song of the Lark
 Gustave Caillebotte
 Houses at Trouville
 Man at his bath
 Man wearing a blouse
 The Yellow Fields at Gennevilliers
 Gustaf Cederström – Funeral procession of King Charles XII
 Albert Edelfelt – Boys Playing on the Shore
 Daniel Chester French – John Harvard (bronze sculpture)
 Alfred Gilbert – sculptures
 Icarus
 Study of a Head
 Félix Resurrección Hidalgo – Las Virgenes Cristianas Expuestas al Populacho
 Henry Holiday – Dante and Beatrice
 John Lavery – On the Bridge at Grez
 Frederic Leighton – Cymon and Iphigenia
 John Seymour Lucas – After Culloden: Rebel Hunting
 Juan Luna – Spoliarium
 Jean-Louis-Ernest Meissonier – The Siege of Paris in 1870
 John Everett Millais – Message from the Sea
 Albert Joseph Moore – Reading Aloud
 Edvard Munch – Morning
 John O'Connor – From Pentonville Road looking west, evening
 Anna Petersen – Breton Girl Looking After Plants in the Hothouse
 Medardo Rosso – Flesh of Others (wax sculpture)
 John Singer Sargent
 Auguste Rodin
 Portrait of Madame X
 Giovanni Segantini - The Bad Mothers
 Georges-Pierre Seurat – Bathers at Asnières
 Alfred Sisley – The Port of Moret-sur-Loing
 Marie Spartali Stillman – Madonna Pietra degli Scrovigni
 Marianne Stokes – Reflection
 Abbott Handerson Thayer – The Sisters
 Vasily Vereshchagin – Blowing from Guns in British India
 Jan Voerman – Days of Mourning

Births
 February 5 – Vlastislav Hofman, Czech painter and architect (died 1964)
 February 12
 Marie Vassilieff, Russian-French painter (died 1957)
 Max Beckmann, German painter (died 1950)
 May 11 – Stanley Anderson, English engraver (died 1966)
 June 19 – Georges Ribemont-Dessaignes, French writer and artist (died 1974)
 June 25 – Daniel-Henry Kahnweiler, German-born French art dealer (died 1979)
 June 30 – Jovan Bijelić, Serbian painter (died 1964).
 July 7 – André Dunoyer de Segonzac, French painter and graphic artist (died 1974)
 July 12 – Amedeo Modigliani, Italian-born painter and sculptor (died 1920)
 September 1 – Hilda Rix Nicholas, Australian painter (died 1961)
 October 6 – MacDonald Gill, English designer (died 1947)
 December 12 (November 30 O.S.) – Zinaida Serebriakova, Russian-born painter (died 1967)
 December 15 – Eugeniusz Zak, Belarusian-born painter (died 1926)
 December 17 – Waldo Peirce, American painter (died 1970)

Deaths
 January 9 – Vito D'Ancona, Italian painter (born 1825)
 January 28 – Alexander Louis Leloir, French painter (born 1843)
 June 13 – Anton Zwengauer, German painter (born 1810)
 June 19 – Adrian Ludwig Richter, German painter and etcher (born 1803)
 October 1 – Theodor Martens, German painter (born 1822)
 October 3 – Hans Makart, Austrian painter and designer (born 1840)
 October 22 – Treffle Berthlaume, Québécois sculptor (born 1803)
 October 31 – Marie Bashkirtseff, Ukrainian-French painter, of TB (born 1858)
 date unknown
 Stanisław Chlebowski, Polish painter, especially of oriental themes (born 1835)
 Lina von Perbandt, German landscape painter (born 1836)
 Carlo Randanini,  Italian painter (year of birth unknown)

References

 
Years of the 19th century in art
1880s in art